State Route 44 (SR 44) is a state highway in the U.S. state of Tennessee. It runs from US 11E/US 19W/SR 34 in Bluff City, just south of the split of US 19W and US 19E, northeast via Hickory Tree and Holston Valley to the Virginia state line, where it becomes Virginia State Route 75. The entire highway is located within Sullivan County.

Route description

SR 44 begins as a 2-lane highway in Bluff City at an intersection with US 11E/US 19W/SR 34 just south of that route's interchange with US 19E/SR 37, where US 19E and 19W merge to form US 19. The highway then goes north along the former route of US 11E/US 19, where it has an intersection with US 19E/SR 37 a short distance later before entering downtown. The highway then parallels the South Fork Holston River and a rail road track before having an intersection with SR 390, where it breaks away from the former route of US 11E/US 19 to follow its own path. The highway then makes a right onto Fleming Drive before immediately making a right onto Main Street. SR 44 then passes through the center of town before leaving Bluff City and going east, still paralleling the Houston River. The highway then winds its way through farmland as it gradually starts veering northeast, where it has an intersection with SR 358. SR 44 then passes through the community of Hickory Tree before crossing the River and turning north via a sharp left at a 4-way stop intersection. The highway then comes to an intersection with US 421/SR 34, where it turns east to become concurrent with that highway. They go east as a 4-lane divided highway to enter Holston Valley where it has an intersection with SR 435, before narrowing to 2-lanes, where leaves US 421/SR 34 and goes north via a Y-Intersection shortly afterwards. SR 44 then passes by a marina for South Holston Lake shortly before coming to an end at the Virginia state line, where it continues into Virginia as Virginia State Route 75.

Major intersections

References

044
044